An Analytic History of Persian Modern Poetry is a research work on Persian contemporary poetry by Mohammad Shams Langeroodi, first published in 1998.

Format 

The book is in 4 volumes including the events in Iranian poetry from 1905 to 1979. It goes year by year starting with a brief description of political and social condition of the time following with a commentary on the literary criticism condition. A list of literary magazines and published poetry books is provided for each year. From each work, depending on its importance, it has a brief description, selected poems and includes different reviews.

Overall it includes seventy years of: bibliography of Persian modern poetry, Persian poetry publications (magazines, special issues, etc.) and a list of Persian poetry criticism.

Each volume covers the following years:

Volume. 1: 1905–1953
Volume. 2: 1953–1962
Volume. 3: 1962–1970
Volume. 4: 1970–1979

Importance 
An Analytic History of Persian Modern Poetry was the first major research work on the subject.

Notes

1998 non-fiction books
Books about Iran
Persian poetry
History of poetry